The Yunnanolepidae were an extinct family of Yunnanolepiforme placoderms from China. They existed during the Silurian and Devonian.

References 

Placoderms of Asia